Boronia hippopalus, commonly known as velvet boronia is a plant in the citrus family Rutaceae and is endemic to Tasmania. It is an erect, woody shrub with pinnate leaves and white to pink, four-petalled flowers.

Description

Taxonomy and naming
Boronia hippopala was first formally described in 2003 by Marco F. Duretto who published the description in  Muelleria from a specimen collected on Mount Arthur. The specific epithet (hippopalus) is derived from the words meaning "horse" and "marsh", referring to Horseshoe Marsh, one of the only three locations where this species occurs. However, hippopala is an orthographical variant because there is no feminine form of the Latin word palus and the spelling must be corrected to hippopalus.

Distribution and habitat
The velvet boronia grows in wet heath or scrub. It is only known from three populations near St Pauls River in northern Tasmania.

Conservation
Boronia hippopalus, (as B. hippopala) is listed as "vulnerable" under the Commonwealth Government Environment Protection and Biodiversity Conservation Act 1999 (EPBC) Act and the Tasmanian Government Threatened Species Protection Act 1995.The main threats to the species are dieback caused by Phytophthora cinnamomi, inappropriate fire regimes and changes in water flow.

References 

hippopalus
Flora of Tasmania
Plants described in 2003
Taxa named by Marco Duretto